Benny Östlund (born 6 March 1952) is a Swedish sports shooter. He competed at the 1988 Summer Olympics and the 1992 Summer Olympics.

References

1952 births
Living people
Swedish male sport shooters
Olympic shooters of Sweden
Shooters at the 1988 Summer Olympics
Shooters at the 1992 Summer Olympics
People from Dalarna